The North Shore Conference is a high school athletic conference in Wisconsin, USA, including ten schools from the Greater Milwaukee area.

Cedarburg Bulldogs
Grafton Black Hawks
Hartford Orioles
Homestead Highlanders
Nicolet Knights
Port Washington Pirates
Slinger Owls
West Bend East Suns
West Bend West Spartans
Whitefish Bay Blue Dukes

References

External links
 Official website

Wisconsin high school sports conferences
High school sports conferences and leagues in the United States